Heiko Lucks is a Namibian politician. A member of the Rally for Democracy and Progress, Lucks was elected to the National Assembly of Namibia in the 2009 general election.

In September 2010, Lucks and eight other opposition politicians were sworn-in as members of the National Assembly following a six-month boycott due to electoral irregularities in the 2009 election.

References

Year of birth missing (living people)
Living people
Members of the National Assembly (Namibia)
Rally for Democracy and Progress (Namibia) politicians